Bites is the first full-length studio album by Canadian industrial band Skinny Puppy, released as an LP through Nettwerk in 1985.  It was reissued in 1993 on CD with additional material compiled from cassette releases, international releases, and previously undistributed tracks. The cover art was designed by Steven R. Gilmore.

Bites was certified gold by Music Canada on August 5, 1994.

Background

The first CD release of Bites was on the compilation Bites and Remission in 1987. This release replaced the songs "Assimilate" and "The Choke" with remixed versions and it did not include all of the tracks featured on the earlier cassette release, which was significantly longer. A similar but distinct CD called Remission & Bites was released by Play It Again Sam in Europe during the same year. On the 1993 reissue, the song "One Day" is not listed anywhere in the artwork or credits.

The Tear Garden's self-titled EP from 1986 (one year after Bites originally saw release) includes a revised version of "The Centre Bullet" featuring vocals by Edward Ka-Spel, slightly retitled to "The Center Bullet." The two songs are identical save for the presence of vocals by The Legendary Pink Dots singer. Late reissues of The Tear Garden album Tired Eyes Slowly Burning also feature that version of "The Center Bullet". Having both been made by cEvin Key and Dave Ogilvie, it is unclear whether the track was originally a creation of Skinny Puppy or of The Tear Garden.

Critical reception

Billboard magazine recommended Bites, calling it a "strong club collection a la Kraftwerk". Tom Harrison of The Province gave the album a favorable review, calling it "willfully ugly and menacing", and  described its songs as "cleanly produced" and "carefully textured". Tim DiGravina of AllMusic was also receptive, calling the album a "fascinating look at Skinny Puppy in embryonic form", and described its sound as "delicate and pristine". DiGravina also noted the influence of groups such as Depeche Mode, Human League, and Cabaret Voltaire.

Mike Abrams of the Ottawa Citizen thought Bites was depressing and for people with "undiscriminating tastes". He named the songs "Assimilate" and "Last Call" as the album's best tracks. James Muretich of the Calgary Herald was less impressed with Bites, calling the record "annoying" and likened the band to robots.

In 1999, Chart magazine listed Bites among the most influential Canadian albums of the 80s.

Track listing

Samples
The song "Assimilate" contains a sample from the 1976 film Marathon Man – "Is it safe?".
The song "Blood on the Wall" contains a sample from The Texas Chainsaw Massacre (1974) – "You see? They say it's just an old man talking. You laugh at an old man. There's them that laughs and knows better." It also contains samples from The Tenant (1976).
The song "The Choke" contains samples from the 1976 film The Tenant – "If you cut off my head, what would I say? Me and my... Me and my head, or me and my body?".
The songs "Church", "Icebreaker", "Love" and "Basement" contain samples from the 1973 film The Legend of Hell House (1973) – "Get out before I kill you all!"

Personnel
Credits from AllMusic.

Skinny Puppy
 Nivek Ogre – vocals, guitars, synthesizers, metallic percussion, treatments and objects
 cEvin Key – bass guitars, guitars, synthesizers, sequencers, tapes, sampler, treatments, acoustic and metallic percussions, drums

Additional musicians and artwork
 Bill Leeb (as Wilhelm Schroeder) – bass synth on "Icebreaker" and "The Choke"
 D. Pleven – bass guitar destruction on "Blood on the Wall"
 Steven R. Gilmore – artwork
 Greg Sykes – artwork assistance

Technical personnel
 Dave Ogilvie – production, engineering
 Tom Ellard – production, mixing, tapes, treatments, and digital sampling on "Assimilate"
 Terry McBride – executive production

Certifications

References

1985 albums
Skinny Puppy albums
Nettwerk Records albums
PIAS Recordings albums